Achipteriidae is a family of mites and ticks in the order Sarcoptiformes. There are about 9 genera and at least 80 described species in Achipteriidae.

Genera
 Achipteria Berlese, 1885
 Anachipteria Grandjean, 1932
 Campachipteria Aoki, 1995
 Cerachipteria Grandjean, 1935
 Cubachipteria Balogh & Mahunka, 1979
 Dentachipteria Nevin, 1974
 Hoffmanacarus Mahunka, 1995
 Parachipteria Hammen, 1952
 Plakoribates Popp, 1960

References

Further reading

 
 
 
 

Sarcoptiformes
Acari families